Nkaus Airport  is an airport serving the village of Nkaus, Lesotho.

See also
Transport in Lesotho
List of airports in Lesotho

References

External links
 Nkaus Airport
 OurAirports - Lesotho
 Google Earth

Airports in Lesotho